Eurhizococcus is a genus of true bugs belonging to the family Margarodidae.

The species of this genus are found in South America.

Species:

Eurhizococcus brasiliensis 
Eurhizococcus brevicornis 
Eurhizococcus colombianus

References

Margarodidae